Robert Oscar Uehling (April 23, 1915 – November 29, 2001) was a member of the Wisconsin State Assembly.

Biography
Uehling was born on April 23, 1915, in Wisconsin Rapids, Wisconsin. He attended Santa Monica College and the University of Wisconsin-Madison. During World War II and the Korean War, Uehling served as an officer in the United States Army and the Wisconsin Army National Guard. He died on November 29, 2001, in Madison, Wisconsin.

Political career
Uehling served on the Madison City Council from 1959 to 1961. He was elected to the Assembly in 1960 and was re-elected in 1962 and 1964. Uehling was a Republican.

References

External links

1915 births
2001 deaths
20th-century American politicians
Republican Party members of the Wisconsin State Assembly
Wisconsin city council members
Military personnel from Wisconsin
United States Army officers
National Guard (United States) officers
Wisconsin National Guard personnel
United States Army personnel of World War II
United States Army personnel of the Korean War
Santa Monica College alumni
University of Wisconsin–Madison alumni
People from Wisconsin Rapids, Wisconsin
Politicians from Madison, Wisconsin